Gongxingdun Subdistrict is a subdistrict of Chengguan District, Lanzhou, Gansu Province, People's Republic of China, located  from Lanzhou's centre. In 2010 it had a population of 85,634. It is served by Gongxingdun station of the Lanzhou Metro.

History 
The subdistrict was preceded by Gongxingdun township, founded in 1949. In 1962 it was changed into a commune, and in 1983 back to a township. In 2005 the current Gongxingdun Subdistrict was established.

Administrative divisions 
, it administers the following: 
Gongxingdunhou Street Community
Wulipuxi Community
Duanjiatandong Community
Duanjiatanxi Community
Donggangdong Road Community
Wulipudong Community
Wulipu Village
Duanjiatan Village
Fanjiawan Village
Gongxingdun Village

See also 
 List of township-level divisions of Gansu
 Gongxingdun Airport

References 

Geography of Lanzhou
Township-level divisions of Gansu
Subdistricts of the People's Republic of China